Mohawk High School is a public high school in Marcola, Oregon, United States.

Academics
In 2008, 81% of the school's seniors received their high school diploma. Of 31 students, 25 graduated, 3 dropped out, 2 received a modified diploma, and 1 is still in high school.

In 2015 Mohawk made the first softball team in 12 years and they also made the first Mohawk Valley LEO Club.

References

High schools in Lane County, Oregon
Public high schools in Oregon